Agathia largita is a species of moth of the family Geometridae first described by Jeremy Daniel Holloway in 1996. It is found on Borneo and Sumatra.

The wingspan is 17–18 mm.

External links

Geometrinae
Moths of Asia